Dashiin Tserendagva (unknown – unknown) was a Mongolian chess player, three-times Mongolian Chess Championship winner (1953, 1954, 1957).

Biography
In the 1950s Dashiin Tserendagva was one of Mongolian leading chess players. He was the first multiple chess champion of the country when he won Mongolian Chess Championship in 1953, 1954, and 1957.

Dashiin Tserendagva played for Mongolia in the Chess Olympiad:
 In 1956, at first reserve board in the 12th Chess Olympiad in Moscow (+3, =1, -2).

References

External links

Dashiin Tserendagva chess games at 365chess.com

Year of birth missing
Year of death missing
Mongolian chess players
Chess Olympiad competitors
20th-century chess players